Zhankuic acids are sterols isolated from the fungus Taiwanofungus camphoratus. Zhankuic acid C possesses in vitro anti-inflammatory properties due to its role as a selective TLR4/MD-2 antagonist.

References

External links 
Zhankuic acid A - PubChem
Zhankuic acid A - ChemSpider
Zhankuic acid B - PubChem
Zhankuic acid B - ChemSpider
Zhankuic acid C - PubChem
Zhankuic acid C - ChemSpider
Antileukemia component, dehydroeburicoic acid from Antrodia camphorata induces DNA damage and apoptosis in vitro and in vivo models

Sterols